The LPGA Drive On Championship is a series of women's professional golf tournaments on the LPGA Tour created after several tournaments were cancelled as a result of the COVID-19 pandemic. Each tournament uses the tour's "Drive On" slogan to support the resilience of the tour.

Ohio
The Ohio tournament was held in July 2020 as the LPGA Tour's first tournament since the tour was halted in February 2020.

The Ohio tournament was hosted at the Inverness Club in Toledo, Ohio. The tournament did not have spectators nor a pro-am, and it featured a field of 144 players. Although lacking a title sponsor, the players competed for a $1 million purse, primarily funded by sponsors of cancelled tournaments. Danielle Kang won the inaugural event by one stoke over Céline Boutier.

Georgia
The Georgia tournament was announced on September 15, 2020, as the LPGA replaced all three stops (Korea, Taiwan, Japan) on the Asian Swing that were called off by further pandemic restrictions.  

The Georgia tournament was hosted at the Reynolds Lake Oconee Great Waters Course in Greensboro, Georgia, located halfway between Augusta and Atlanta, on a Jack Nicklaus-designed course that opened in 1992 and was refurbished in 2019.  The tournament used a full field of 144 players, competing for a $1.3 million purse. Ally McDonald won her first career tournament by one stroke over Danielle Kang, who was going for the "Drive On Championship" double.

Florida
The first Florida tournament was held in March 2021 at the Golden Ocala Golf Club in Ocala, Florida. Austin Ernst won by five strokes over Jennifer Kupcho. In February 2022 at Crown Colony Golf Club in Fort Myers, Florida, Leona Maguire became the first Irish winner on the LPGA tour, finishing 3 strokes clear of Lexi Thompson.

Arizona
The first Arizona tournament will be held in March 2023 at the Superstition Mountain Golf & Country Club in Gold Canyon, Arizona. The 132-player field will compete for a higher purse, $1.75 million, with $262,500 going to the winner.

Winners

References

External links
Coverage on LPGA Tour's official site – Ohio
Coverage on LPGA Tour's official site – Georgia
Coverage on LPGA Tour's official site – Florida

LPGA Tour events
Golf in Ohio
Golf in Georgia (U.S. state)
Golf in Florida
Golf in Arizona
Sports competitions in Ohio
Sports competitions in Georgia (U.S. state)
Sports competitions in Florida
Sports competitions in Arizona
Recurring sporting events established in 2020
2020 establishments in Ohio